Balu Mahi is a 2017 Pakistani romantic comedy directed by Haissam Hussain, produced by Sadia Jabbar and written by Saad Azhar. A-Plus Films handled distribution of the film in Pakistan, and Grand Showbiz Media handled it internationally.

Plot
The movie begins with Bilal "Balu" (Osman Khalid Butt) gatecrashing a wedding with the goal of preventing it. He mistakenly believes the bride is his ex-girlfriend, whom he still loves. The plot thickens when he discovers the bride is Mahi (Ainy Jaffri), not his ex, and that she is being forced into an arranged marriage by her family. Mahi sees Balu's gatecrashing as an opportunity to escape, and runs off with Balu.

Cast
 Osman Khalid Butt as Bilal 'Balu' Malik
 Ainy Jaffri as Mahi Jahangir
 Javed Sheikh as Hasan's father
 Hina Rizvi as Hasan's mother
 Sadaf Kanwal as Sharmeen Mukhtiyar
 Aliee Shaikh as Polo Coach 
 Zeeshan Ali 
 Durdana Butt
 Shafqat Cheema 
 Adeel Hashmi 
 Khurram Pataras

Production
The film is directed by Haissam Hussain. The film has been written by Saad Azhar. Other well-known and credible names associated with the film include producers Sadia Jabbar & Muhammad Ashraf Chaudry Muhammad Arshad Chaudry, and Executive Producer Mian Yousaf Salahuddin HKC Entertainment chairman Hammad Chaudhry, owner of Cinestar in Pakistan, will distribute the film in Pakistan while Grand Showbiz Media is the International Distributor of the film (they have recently distributed the blockbuster Pakistani Film Actor in Law). Other leading industry names associated with the project include music composer Sahir Ali Bagga, who has composed five songs for the film. Rahat Fateh Ali Khan sung a Qawwali titled "Rang De Chunar" where he makes an exclusive cameo for the film. It starrs Osman Khalid Butt, Ainy Jaffri and Sadaf Kanwal in the lead cast. The soundtrack is composed by Sahir Ali Bagga. The dance in the film is choreographed by Pappu Samrat and Wahab Shah, whilst Saleem Daad served as the Director of Photography (DOP).

Filming
The shooting of the film began in January 2016. The film was shot in scenic locations of Northern Pakistan.

Release 
The film is released in Pakistan on 10 February 2017.

Home media
World television premier of the movie was held by Geo Entertainment on Eid ul Adha 2018.

Digital media
The film was released later on Netflix as VOD.

Box office

Critical reception
Rafay Mahmood of The Express Tribune rated 3/5 and commented, "Balu Mahi is long but not tiring. Watch it so see Pakistani actors shake a leg in style".

Mehreen Hasan of DAWN Images also rated 3/5 and said, "Balu Mahi is a rom-com with some dark, dramatic moments, but perhaps it's better described and digested as a fantasy film."

Buraq Shabbir of The News praised its cinematography and said, "While the narrative isn't extraordinary or truly original, Balu Mahi has a comedic undertone that keeps the viewer intrigued throughout."

Shahjehan Saleem of Something Haute gave it 3 out 5 stars and said, "the film ends up confused between what it wants in a lot of places, where forced drama, equally confusing moments of conflict, and dance sequences come in."

Mehar Khursheed of Newsline commented, "The movie has several moments of hilarity and the acting is more than adequate, worth watching for pure entertainment value."

Hamza Shafique of Dubai Desi Reviews gave film 1.5 out of 5 desi stars and commented, "Balu Mahi feels like a teen YouTuber's halfhearted attempt to create a parody of Jab We Met and Dil Bole Haddipa."

Accolades

Soundtrack
All music is composed by Sahir Ali Bagga.

See also
 Bin Roye
 Akbari Asghari
 List of Pakistani films of 2017

References

External links

Sadia Jabbar Productions at YouTube

2017 films
Pakistani romantic comedy films
2017 romantic comedy films
Films scored by Sahir Ali Bagga
Films shot in Gilgit-Baltistan
2010s Urdu-language films